The  is a family of priests and warriors who have served the Miwa Shrine for generations. The ancestor of the Miwa family is said to be Okuninushi no Mikoto. The Omiwa clan, also known as the Ogami clan, were a prominent family in ancient Japan known for their responsibility in performing state rituals for the Yamato sovereignty. The clan rose to prominence in the period between the latter half of the 5th century and the 6th century, before the establishment of capital cities such as Heijo-kyo and Heian-kyo. The clan's main center of influence was the area around Mt. Miwa, which was considered a significant religious and political site. According to tradition, the ancestors of the Ogami clan were able to calm the first epidemic in Japan and this belief has been passed down through the generations to the present-day Omiwa Shrine. Recent research has shed light on the role and significance of the Ogami clan in ancient royal power and rituals.

In the 8th year of the reign of Emperor Temmu, the Miwa clan was renamed Miwa-no-kun and given the surname Ogami-chosin. The descendants of Koichi Maro's son Shinobito served as the Ogami High Priestess. According to notes in the genealogy, the Daiminushi family served the Southern Court during the period of the Northern and Southern Dynasties. Many members of the family died in the civil wars between the Northern and Southern dynasties.

After the Muromachi period, the legitimate lineage served as high priests, but some of the family members became warriors and served the Miyoshi and Kitabatake clans. After the Hobo break, the Daikami family took the name Takamiya and served the Ogami Shrine, and their descendants continued to serve the shrine until the Meiji Restoration.

One branch of the Miwa family, known as the Hiyoshi, served the Usa Hachiman God in ancient times. Their descendants served as the chief priest of the Usa Jingu Shrine for a long time until they were replaced by the Usa clan. From their descendants, medieval warriors such as Ogata, Ono, and Anan were born, and during the Warring States period, they played a part in the military power of the Otomo clan, the feudal lords of Chinsei.

References 

Japanese clans